Eighty-five Guggenheim Fellowships were awarded in 1941.

1941 U.S. and Canadian Fellows

1941 Latin American and Caribbean Fellows

See also
 Guggenheim Fellowship
 List of Guggenheim Fellowships awarded in 1940
 List of Guggenheim Fellowships awarded in 1942

References

1941
1941 awards